Jet Jurgensmeyer (born November 27, 2004) is an American actor. He began his career as a child actor, playing the role of Spanky in the 2014 film The Little Rascals Save the Day, and Bobby Anderson in the 2016 Disney Channel television film Adventures in Babysitting.

Early life and career
Jurgensmeyer was born and raised in Nashville, Tennessee, where his parents owned a live music and dinner show restaurant.

Jurgensmeyer made his television debut with a guest role on the CBS television series CSI: Crime Scene Investigation in 2010. In 2012 he was cast as Spanky, one of the lead roles, in Alex Zamm's 2014 film The Little Rascals Save the Day. He has appeared in films such as American Sniper and Devil's Knot. In 2016 he appeared in the Disney Channel film Adventures in Babysitting, playing Bobby the middle son of one of the sets of children being babysat. The same year Jurgensmeyer was cast in Nickelodeon's Legends of the Hidden Temple television film, playing Dudley the youngest of the three siblings who travel through temple. In 2017, he provided the voice of the young version of Peyton Manning's character Guapo in Blue Sky Studios' Ferdinand. From 2018 to 2020, he has portrayed Boyd Baxter on the Fox comedy series Last Man Standing, and from 2019 to 2021, he has been part of the cast of the Disney Junior children's television series T.O.T.S. voicing Pip the Penguin.

Filmography

Film

Television

References

External links
 
 Official website

2004 births
Living people
21st-century American male actors
American male child actors
American male film actors
American male television actors
American male voice actors